The 1968–69 NBA season was the 76ers' 20th season in the NBA and 6th season in Philadelphia. The team posted a record of 55–27. In the opening round of the playoffs, they lost to the Boston Celtics 4–1, with 3 of the losses coming at the Spectrum. Without Wilt Chamberlain, the 76ers turned to Lucious Jackson to play center in a more up-tempo, fast-breaking style to be run by new head coach Jack Ramsey, but Jackson suffered a major injury during the season and was never the same player.

Roster

Regular season

Season standings

x – clinched playoff spot

Record vs. opponents

Game log

Playoffs

|- align="center" bgcolor="#ffcccc"
| 1
| March 26
| Boston
| L 100–114
| Billy Cunningham (29)
| Darrall Imhoff (19)
| Billy Cunningham (6)
| Spectrum8,151
| 0–1
|- align="center" bgcolor="#ffcccc"
| 2
| March 28
| @ Boston
| L 103–134
| Chet Walker (26)
| Billy Cunningham (11)
| Matt Guokas (4)
| Boston Garden13,751
| 0–2
|- align="center" bgcolor="#ffcccc"
| 3
| March 30
| Boston
| L 118–125
| Billy Cunningham (33)
| Imhoff, Cunningham (14)
| Hal Greer (7)
| Spectrum15,244
| 0–3
|- align="center" bgcolor="#ccffcc"
| 4
| April 1
| @ Boston
| W 119–116
| Hal Greer (24) 
| Darrall Imhoff (20)
| Hal Greer (7)
| Boston Garden14,017
| 1–3
|- align="center" bgcolor="#ffcccc"
| 5
| April 4
| Boston
| L 90–93
| Billy Cunningham (23) 
| Darrall Imhoff (19)
| Archie Clark (7)
| Spectrum15,244
| 1–4
|-

Awards and records
Billy Cunningham, All-NBA First Team
Hal Greer, All-NBA Second Team

References

Philadelphia
Philadelphia 76ers seasons
Philadel
Philadel